Goran Paracki (born 21 January 1987 in Pula) is a Croatian football player who plays for Karlovac 1919.

Club career

Wellington Phoenix
On 20 July 2017, Paracki signed a one-year deal with Wellington Phoenix.

Neftchi Baku
On 23 June 2018, Paracki signed a one-year contract with Neftçi PFK. Neftchi Baku confirmed Paracki's release on 15 May 2019.

Slaven Belupo
On 29 June 2019, Paracki returned to Slaven Belupo after four years.

References

Profile at HLSZ

External links
 

1987 births
Living people
Sportspeople from Pula
Association football midfielders
Croatian footballers
Croatia youth international footballers
HNK Rijeka players
NK Novalja players
NK Rudar Labin players
NK Karlovac players
Pécsi MFC players
RNK Split players
NK Inter Zaprešić players
NK Slaven Belupo players
NK Istra 1961 players
Wellington Phoenix FC players
Neftçi PFK players
Croatian Football League players
First Football League (Croatia) players
Nemzeti Bajnokság I players
A-League Men players
Azerbaijan Premier League players
Croatian expatriate footballers
Expatriate footballers in Hungary
Expatriate footballers in Azerbaijan
Expatriate association footballers in New Zealand
Croatian expatriate sportspeople in Hungary
Croatian expatriate sportspeople in New Zealand
Croatian expatriate sportspeople in Azerbaijan